Pherallodichthys meshimaensis is a species of clingfish known from the western Pacific Ocean in reef environments around Japan and the Philippines.  This species grows to a length of  TL though more commonly they only reach a length of  SL.  This species is the only known member of its genus.

References

Gobiesocidae
Monotypic fish genera
Fish described in 1983